Alec Mazo (born April 5, 1978) is an American investor who works at DGA Capital. He became known for his participation in the American edition of the reality television series Dancing with the Stars, the first season of which he won with partner Kelly Monaco. He participated in five seasons of the television show and four DWTS tours, produced live stage shows for casinos and executive produced a 70 city live stage tour in collaboration with Troika Entertainment (producer of Wicked, Phantom of the Opera, Cats, Annie).

Early life
Mazo was born just 50 kilometers from Chernobyl, Ukraine into a Jewish family. He has been dancing since he was 5 years old. At age 12, he immigrated from the Soviet Union to San Antonio, Texas, and later to San Francisco, where his former engineer mother, Natalia, opened a dance school. Mazo helped run the school to make ends meet. His family moved from the former USSR as refugees, with nothing in their pockets.

Education and personal life
He studied computer science, and then cognitive science at the University of California, Berkeley . After DWTS, Mazo went to Stanford University to get his Alfred P. Sloan Masters in Management. He ran a production company specializing in live stage entertainment and television reality formats. He is currently a general partner at DGA Capital, investing in the capital markets. 

When he was a teenager, Mazo worked as the CEO of the Genesis Dance Sport studio in San Francisco. Expanding the studio into Los Angeles has been one of his goals. He has one brother, Genya, who's also a ballroom dancer and has performed on the Dancing with the Stars tour. Alec Mazo is married to his long-time dancing partner dancer Edyta Śliwińska, a native of Poland.  The couple have a son born in 2014 and a daughter born in 2017.

Career
Mazo appeared in the 1998 movie Dance With Me. Mazo turned professional shortly before producers of Dancing with the Stars began their search for dancers to star on the show.

Mazo won the first season of Dancing with the Stars with his partner, Kelly Monaco.

Mazo returned to the ballroom on March 19 for Season 4, this time partnered with former supermodel Paulina Porizkova, but were the first couple eliminated. Despite being eliminated first, Paulina along with Shandi Finnessey (Who was eliminated the very next week). Both hold a higher average than a few celebrities who lasted longer than them.

Mazo appeared on the fifth season of Dancing with the Stars. Mazo and his partner, supermodel Josie Maran, were eliminated on September 26, 2007, after the first week of competition, making it the second time in a row he was eliminated first.

Mazo competed for the title with partner, Grammy Award-winning singer, Toni Braxton in Season 7 of Dancing with the Stars. After six dances, Braxton and Mazo became the fifth couple to be eliminated from the season.

In Season 9, Mazo was paired with Olympic swimmer, Natalie Coughlin. They were the fifth couple to be eliminated despite relatively good scores and received a standing ovation from the crowd and judges.

Dancing with the Stars performances
With celebrity partner Kelly Monaco: 23.0

With celebrity partner Paulina Porizkova: 20.0

With celebrity partner Josie Maran: 16.0

With celebrity partner Toni Braxton: 22.6

With celebrity partner Natalie Coughlin: 22.5

References

External links
Alec Mazo.com Official Website
Alec Mazo - Alec's Myspace

1978 births
American ballroom dancers
Living people
People from Gomel
American people of Belarusian-Jewish descent
Soviet emigrants to the United States
People from San Antonio
University of California, Berkeley alumni
Stanford Graduate School of Business alumni
Dancing with the Stars (American TV series) winners